A referendum on a new constitution and citizenship was held in Estonia on 28 June 1992. Voters were asked whether they approved of the new constitution drawn up by the Constitutional Assembly and extending suffrage to people registered as citizens. The new constitution was approved by 91.9% of voters, whilst the suffrage extension was rejected by 53.5%. Voter turnout was 66.8% for the constitution question and 66.7% for the suffrage question.

Results

New constitution

Suffrage extension

References

Referendums in Estonia
1992 referendums
1992 in Estonia
Constitutional referendums in Estonia